Torche is the debut album by American metal band Torche. The album was released through Robotic Empire on March 8, 2005. It was also reissued on June 18, 2007, through Rock Action Records with a bonus track and alternate artwork.
The opening track, "Charge of the Brown Recluse", is a new version of the song that was released before by the band Floor, which Steve Brooks and Juan Montoya were members, and appears in the box-set Below & Beyond.

Track listing

Reissue bonus track
"Make Me Alive" – 2:31

Personnel
Steve Brooks – guitar, vocals
Jonathan Nuñez – bass
Rick Smith – drums
Juan Montoya – guitars

References

Torche albums
2005 debut albums
Robotic Empire albums